Nephrurus laevissimus, also known as the smooth knob-tailed gecko , is a species of gecko. Like all species of Nephrurus, it is endemic to Australia.

References

Geckos of Australia
Nephrurus
Reptiles described in 1958
Taxa named by Robert Mertens